Alexey Churkin (born 19 March 2004) is a Kazakhstani weightlifter. He won the bronze medal in the men's 73kg event at the 2022 World Weightlifting Championships held in Bogotá, Colombia. He won the silver medal in the men's 73 kg event at the 2021 Islamic Solidarity Games held in Konya, Turkey.

He won the silver medal in his event at the 2022 Junior World Weightlifting Championships held in Heraklion, Greece.

Achievements

References

External links 
 

Living people
2004 births
Place of birth missing (living people)
Kazakhstani male weightlifters
Islamic Solidarity Games competitors for Kazakhstan
Islamic Solidarity Games medalists in weightlifting
World Weightlifting Championships medalists
21st-century Kazakhstani people